Rzhaksinsky District is an administrative and municipal district (raion), one of the twenty-three in Tambov Oblast, Russia. It is located in the south of the oblast. The district borders with Rasskazovsky District in the north, Inzhavinsky District in the east, Uvarovsky District in the south, and with Sampursky District in the west. Its administrative center is the urban locality (a work settlement) of Rzhaksa. Population: 18,565 (2010 Census);  The population of Rzhaksa accounts for 28.0% of the district's total population.

Notable residents 

 Vladimir Semyonov (1911–1992), Soviet diplomat

See also
Inokovka

References

Notes

Sources

Districts of Tambov Oblast